Parkway Newbury is a retail and residential development in Newbury, Berkshire that opened on 27 October 2011. It includes  of retail and restaurant accommodation and Marks & Spencer, 578 shopper car parking spaces, 113 residents parking spaces. The mixed-use scheme also consists of 147 luxury residential apartments and 37 affordable housing units being built above the shopping centre.

History 
 The planning of the 5.7acre site began in 2004. The development began in March 2009 with the site being cleared of buildings. Before construction began, West Berkshire Council had to take several steps to compulsory purchase land for the development. In order for the centre to be joined to the existing streets, 35 and 36 Northbrook Street had to be knocked through.

Retail 
It is anchored by an extended Marks & Spencer department store. The shopping centre houses approximately 50 stores, cafes and restaurants.

As of November 2014, stores include Marks & Spencer, New Look, H&M, Monsoon Accessorize, Joules.

Residential 
Parkway Living is a development of 147 one, two and three bedroom apartments and penthouses. Options of views across Victoria Park, private terraces and balconies. Each apartment and penthouse comes with designated parking in the underground car park.

Gallery

References 

Buildings and structures in Newbury, Berkshire
Shopping centres in Berkshire
Buildings and structures under construction in the United Kingdom